Saltwort is a common name for various genera of flowering plants that thrive in salty environments, typically in coastal salt marshes and seashores, including:

Salsola and related genera within subfamily Salsoloideae
Salicornia
Tecticornia
Sarcocornia
Suaeda
Halogeton
 and others: the above genera are in the family Amaranthaceae, which contains certain other saltwort genera not mentioned above, but not all Amaranthaceae are saltworts.

Batis, in the family Bataceae

The ashes of these plants yield soda ash, which is an important ingredient for glassmaking and soapmaking.

See also glasswort – glassworts are saltworts, and saltworts can be glassworts

See also Saltbush aka Atriplex, a genus thriving in salty environments